Sea pens are colonial marine cnidarians belonging to the order Pennatulacea. There are 14 families within the order and 35 extant genera; it is estimated that of 450 described species, around 200 are valid. Sea pens have a cosmopolitan distribution, being found in tropical and temperate waters worldwide, as well as from the intertidal to depths of more than 6100 m. Sea pens are grouped with the octocorals, together with sea whips (gorgonians).

Although the group is named for its supposed resemblance to antique quill pens, only sea pen species belonging to the suborder Subselliflorae live up to the comparison. Those belonging to the much larger suborder Sessiliflorae lack feathery structures and grow in club-like or radiating forms. The latter suborder includes what are commonly known as sea pansies.

The earliest accepted fossils are known from the Cambrian-aged Burgess Shale (Thaumaptilon). Similar fossils from the Ediacaran 
may show the dawn of sea pens. Precisely what these early fossils are, however, is not decided.

Taxonomy 
The order Pennatulacea consists of the following families:

 Chunellidae
 Echinoptilidae
 Renillidae
 Scleroptilidae
 Stachyptilidae
 Suborder Sessiliflorae
 Anthoptilidae
 Funiculinidae 
 Kophobelemnidae 
 Protoptilidae
 Pseudumbellulidae 
 Umbellulidae
 Veretillidae 
 Suborder Subsessiliflorae
 Halipteridae
 Pennatulidae
 Virgulariidae

Biology
Due to the geographic distribution, a result of inflating themselves with seawater which causes them to get carried by the currents, there is genetic variation within the different species of Sea Pens.  There are many populations of Sea Pens found in mainly Indian waters. It is their Polyps that are affected genetically, as they have dispersed within the different waters and islands, and how they use their Polyps (tentacles) to protect themselves and other species.

As octocorals, sea pens are colonial animals with multiple polyps (which look somewhat like miniature sea anemones), each with eight tentacles. Unlike other octocorals, however, a sea pen's polyps are specialized to specific functions: a single polyp develops into a rigid, erect stalk (the rachis) and loses its tentacles, forming a bulbous "root" or peduncle at its base. The other polyps branch out from this central stalk, forming water intake structures (siphonozooids), feeding structures (autozooids) with nematocysts, and reproductive structures. The entire colony is fortified by calcium carbonate in the form of spicules and a central axial rod.

Sea pens are sometimes brightly coloured; the orange sea pen (Ptilosarcus gurneyi) is a notable example.

While generally sessile animals, sea pens are able to relocate and re-anchor themselves if need be. They position themselves favourably in the path of currents, ensuring a steady flow of plankton, the sea pens' chief source of food. Their primary predators are nudibranchs and sea stars, some of which feed exclusively on sea pens. The sea pens' ability to be clumped together and spatially unpredictable hinders sea stars' predation abilities. When touched, some sea pens emit a bright greenish light; this is known as bioluminescence. They may also force water out of their bodies for defence, rapidly deflating and retreating into their peduncle.

Like other anthozoans, sea pens reproduce by coordinating a release of sperm and eggs into the water column; this may occur seasonally or throughout the year. Fertilized eggs develop into larvae called planulae which drift freely for about a week before settling on the substrate. Mature sea pens provide shelter for other animals, such as juvenile fish. Analysis of rachis growth rings indicates sea pens may live for 100 years or more, if the rings are indeed annual in nature.

Some sea pens exhibit glide reflection symmetry, rare among non-extinct animals.

Aquarium trade
Sea pens are sometimes sold in the aquarium trade. However, they are generally hard to care for because they need a very deep substrate and have special food requirements.

References

External links

 
Octocorallia
Bioluminescent cnidarians
Extant Cambrian first appearances